Richard L. Zellmann is a United States Army brigadier general who serves as the deputy director for operations of the United States Space Command. Previously, he served as the deputy director for strategy, plans, and policy of the same command.

Dates of promotion

References

External links

Year of birth missing (living people)
Living people
Place of birth missing (living people)
United States Army generals